Manarom Hospital is Thailand’s private hospital for mental and behavioral healthcare. Manarom Hospital provides comprehensive mental health services to patients of all ages from children, adults to elderly.[1] The word "Manarom" is pronounced as ‘ma-na-rhom’ and means "Happy Mind".

History 
Manarom Hospital was founded in 2004 by the Psychiatric Associates Corporation or PAC (Siam) Co.Ltd with a total investment of three hundred million baht. On 1 October 2006, His Excellency, The Privy Counsellor Dr.Kasem Vatanachai performed the grand opening ceremony of Manarom Hospital and since then Manarom Hospital has opened its door to the public.

Location 
Manarom Hospital is located on Sukhumvit soi 70/3, near Bangna-Trad intersection within the vicinity of Bangkok Metropolitan area.

Services 
 Outpatient Clinic 
Manarom Hospital offers evaluation and treatments for mental health problems. Treatment modalities including counseling, psychopharmacotherapy, psychotherapy, group therapy, relaxation, and anger management training.[2][3]

 Inpatient Care 
The hospital offers 32 inpatient facility in a secure environment. They focus on milieu therapy using a multidisciplinary team approach with psychiatrists, that work with every patient in the unit.

 Rehabilitation Services / Day Program                         
Manarom Hospital offers partial hospitalization for behavioral symptom management, medication monitoring and rehabilitation program.

 Child and Adolescent Psychiatry and Family Treatment Center               
They address the mental health needs of children and their families.[4]

 Geriatric & Neuropsychiatry Services                                                           
Care evaluation and treatment plans for patients age above 55 who experience emotional problems, behavioral problems or cognitive changes related to the aging process or other health related to the aging process.

 Chemical Dependency Treatment Program                                                          
The chemical Dependency program is structured for adolescents and adults with the need for supervised detoxification or for rehabilitation program.

 Sleep Disorder Clinic                                                                                        
Diagnosis and treatment for patients who have difficulties falling asleep, or other medical problems that may occur or exacerbate during sleep.[5]

 Mental Health Education and Services                                                         
Promotion of mental health issues and psychoeducation to the public schools and organizations.[6]

 Manarom Development Center : MDC                                                          
Manarom Hospital offer various psychological services, training to the public and corporates as personality development program.

See also 
List of hospitals in Thailand
List of hospitals in Bangkok

Notes

Footnotes 
1. "First private psychiatric asylum aims to boost care"  The Nation (21 March 2007)http://www.nationmultimedia.com/2007/03/21/national/

2. 1 in 6 Thais can be a bit 'Mental'. (suffer mental illness)https://web.archive.org/web/20110714191913/http://www.nongkhaimap.com/nongkhaiforum/1-in-6-thais-can-be-a-bit-mental-suffer-mental-illness-t6310.html
	
3. Don’t shrug off extreme mood changes, Bangkok Post, section My life (2 April 2009).http://www.bangkokpost.com/life/family/14429/

4. Too much homework not good for kids  Saturday,Paknam Web Thailand Forums(12 July 2008).  http://www.bangkokpost.com/120708_News/12Jul2008_news07.php

5. Sleep Disorder http://www.ingentaconnect.com/content/bsc/cchd/2008/00000034/00000004/art00010

6. Cross-cultural problems in international schools Thursday 16 October 2008, Bangkok Post 16 October 2008 http://www.bangkokpost.com/161008_Mylife/16Oct2008_family01.php

External links 
 Official website of Manarom Hospital www.manarom.com
 Hospital in Bangkok and around Thailand http://www.thaiwebsites.com/hospitals.asp
 Ranking web of Word Hospitals https://web.archive.org/web/20110721044549/http://hospitals.webometrics.info/hospital_by_country.asp?country=th&offset=50

Hospital buildings completed in 2006
Hospitals in Bangkok
Hospitals established in 2004
2004 establishments in Thailand
Psychiatric hospitals in Thailand
Private hospitals in Thailand